Burke & Hare were serial murderers in Edinburgh, Scotland, in 1827 and 1828.

Burke & Hare may also refer to:
 Burke & Hare (1972 film), a British horror film by Vernon Sewell
 Burke & Hare (2010 film), a British black comedy film by John Landis